The 2020 Albany Great Danes football team represented the University at Albany, SUNY in the 2020–21 NCAA Division I FCS football season. They were led by Greg Gattuso, in his seventh season as head coach, and played their home games at Bob Ford Field at Tom & Mary Casey Stadium. The Great Danes played as members of the Colonial Athletic Association.

On July 17, 2020, the Colonial Athletic Association announced that it would not play fall sports due to the COVID-19 pandemic. However, the conference is allowing the option for teams to play as independents for the 2020 season if they still wish to play in the fall.

Previous season

The Great Danes finished the 2019 season ranked No. 18 in the FCS standings and went 9–5, 6–2 in CAA play to finish in second place. The Great Danes were selected for the postseason tournament and advanced to the Second Round before losing 47–21 to Montana State.

Schedule
Albany originally had a game scheduled against Delaware State (September 5), but it was canceled on July 16 due to the MEAC's decision to cancel fall sports due to the COVID-19 pandemic. The CAA released its spring conference schedule on October 27, 2020. On March 31, 2021, Albany canceled their remaining games due to injuries.

References

Albany
Albany Great Danes football seasons
Albany Great Danes football